Ariston of Pella (c. 100 – c. 160), was an apologist and chronicler, who is known only from a mention by Eusebius that "as Aristo relates" in connection with accounts of emperor Hadrian and Simon bar Kokhba. Aristo is Eusebius's source for Hadrian's permanent banishment of Jews from Jerusalem (4.6.3), renamed to Aelia Capitolina.

Eusebius supplies no biographical data, although some later readers have assumed that like many of Eusebius' sources he was possibly a Greek-speaking Christian.

A secondary mention by the Armenian chronicler Moses of Chorene is probably based on Eusebius, but expanded with the comments that he was secretary of "Ardasches", which were read, or misread, to suggest that Aristo was secretary of Mark, first Gentile bishop of Jerusalem. A mention in the Chronicon Paschale reproduces Eusebius.

His name was later connected by Maximus the Confessor (7th century) to the Dialogue of Jason and Papiscus (c.140), although earlier generations evidently did not know the author of that text. This text was also cited by Jerome, leading to confusion in older sources that Jerome mentioned Aristo by name - which he did not. Since the Dialogue was known to Celsus, Origen, Jerome and a later Latin translator, while none of them names the author, the testimony of Maximus - who also mentioned that it was attributed by others to Luke the Evangelist, is not considered reliable.

Notes

2nd-century writers
Christian writers
Christian apologists
2nd-century Christians
Year of birth unknown
Year of death unknown
Year of birth uncertain
Ancient Pellaeans